One-Eyed Men Are Kings is a 1974 French short film directed by Michel Leroy and Edmond Séchan. It won an Oscar in 1975 for Best Short Subject. The Academy Film Archive preserved One-Eyed Men Are Kings in 2012.

Cast
 Paul Préboist as Léon
 Marie Marc as La mère de Léon
 Lyne Chardonnet

References

External links

1974 films
1974 short films
1970s French-language films
French short films
Live Action Short Film Academy Award winners
French independent films
1970s French films